Betty Lynn Buckley (born July 3, 1947) is an American actress and singer. Buckley is the winner of a Tony Award, and was nominated for two Daytime Emmy Awards, two Grammy Awards, and an Olivier Award. In 2012, she was inducted into the American Theater Hall of Fame.

Buckley won the 1983 Tony Award for Best Featured Actress in a Musical for her role as Grizabella in the original Broadway production of Cats. She went on to play Norma Desmond in Sunset Boulevard (1994–96) in both London and New York, receiving a 1995 Olivier Award nomination for Best Actress in a Musical, and was nominated for the 1997 Tony Award for Best Actress in a Musical for Triumph of Love. Her other Broadway credits include 1776 (1969), Pippin (1973), and The Mystery of Edwin Drood (1985). From September 2018-August 2019 she starred as the title role in the U.S. national tour of Hello, Dolly. 

Buckley starred in the TV series Eight Is Enough from 1977 to 1981 and played gym teacher Miss Collins in the 1976 film Carrie, before going on to star in the short-lived Broadway musical version of Carrie in 1988, playing Carrie White's mother, Margaret. Her other film roles include Dixie Scott in Tender Mercies (1983), Sondra Walker in Frantic (1988), Kathy in Another Woman (1988) and Mrs. Jones in The Happening (2008).  She received a Saturn Award nomination for her role as Dr. Karen Fletcher in the 2016 film Split. Her other television credits include the series Oz (2001–03), and the series Preacher (2018).

Early life
Betty Lynn Buckley was born in Big Spring, Texas, and raised in Fort Worth, Texas, the daughter of Betty Bob (née Diltz), a dancer and journalist, and Ernest Lynn Buckley, a retired lieutenant colonel in the U.S. Air Force, former dean of engineering at South Dakota State University, and Architectural Structures professor at the University of Texas - Arlington. She is the oldest of their four children. She has three brothers—Norman Buckley is a film editor and TV director, while Patrick and Michael (died November 21, 2020) trained as engineers. While a student at Texas Christian University, she was a member of Zeta Tau Alpha. She was crowned "Miss Fort Worth" in 1966 and was runner-up in the Miss Texas competition. Buckley was then invited to perform at the Miss America pageant in Atlantic City, where she was spotted by a talent scout. After returning to TCU to earn her college degree, she toured Asia to visit soldiers wounded in the Vietnam War. Then she worked for a time as a reporter for the Fort Worth Press, but went to New York City in 1969, where she landed the role of Martha Jefferson in 1776 her first day in town.

Career

Film and television career
She is known for the 1977–81 TV dramedy Eight Is Enough. She joined the show in its second season when the original star, Diana Hyland, died after the first four episodes of season one, and her character Joan Bradford died as well. Buckley was cast as the widower's new romantic interest, Sandra Sue "Abby" Abbott, who became stepmother of the eight children to which the series' title refers.

Buckley appeared in the original movie version of Carrie in 1976, playing Miss Collins, Carrie's gym teacher. In 1977, she recorded an uncredited solo on the song "Walking in Space", in the movie Hair.

On television, she received two Daytime Emmy Award nominations for Outstanding Performer in a Children's Program/Special, for NBC Special Treat - Bobby and Sarah (1984) and ABC Afterschool Special - Taking a Stand (1989).

Her screen roles during the 1980s include Bruce Beresford's film Tender Mercies, where she played a country music singer and sang the Academy Award-nominated song "Over You". She also appeared in the Woody Allen film Another Woman (1988), Roman Polanski's Frantic (1988), Lawrence's Kasden's Wyatt Earp (1994).

From 2001 to 2003, she played a role in seasons 4–6 of the HBO series Oz.

She also has guest-starred in a number of television series, including Without a Trace, Law & Order: Special Victims Unit, and Monk. She guest-starred in a Christmas special of the TV series Remember WENN, in which she sang "You Make It Christmas". She appeared as Marion Leckie, mother of Robert Leckie in the HBO series The Pacific, which aired in 2010.

Also in 2010, she appeared in the 18th episode of Melrose Place as a food critic cast by her brother Norman Buckley, who directed the episode.  She also guest-starred in an episode of the Fox series The Chicago Code. She was a recurring guest star on Pretty Little Liars as Regina Marin, also directed by her brother Norman. In 2008, Buckley played Mrs. Jones in M. Night Shyamalan's The Happening. In 2017, Buckley was one of the stars of M. Night Shyamalan's Split, the number-one film at the box office for three weeks.

Her other television credits include guest-starring as Meg's mother in The Leftovers on November 30, 2015, appearing in five episodes of the 2017-2021 series Supergirl. Buckley is also cast in season three of the series Preacher in 2018.

Stage career
Buckley made her Broadway debut in 1969 in the original production of the musical 1776; she has been called "The Voice of Broadway" by New York magazine.

In 1982, Buckley starred as Grizabella in the original Broadway production of the musical Cats, which features the song "Memory". She stayed with the production for 18 months. For this role, she won a Tony Award for Best Featured Actress in a Musical.

Buckley starred in both London (1994) and New York (1995) as Norma Desmond in the musical Sunset Boulevard. For her role in the London production, she received an Olivier Award nomination for Best Actress in a Musical.

In 1997, she starred as Hesione in the Broadway musical Triumph of Love and received a Tony Award nomination for Best Actress in a Musical

Buckley sang "Memory" from Cats at the Kennedy Center Honors in December 2006 as part of the tribute to Andrew Lloyd Webber. In 2007, Buckley appeared with Quintessence at Lincoln Center in its Great American Songbook series.

Buckley participated in a reading of the musical Ruthless! in September, 2010, playing the role of Sylvia St. Croix/Ruth DelMarco. She then played Mrs. White in the off-Broadway comedy White's Lies from March–May 2010. In 2011, Buckley starred in the Dallas Theater Center production of Arsenic and Old Lace by Joseph Kesselring with Tovah Feldshuh.

In 1988, Buckley starred as Margaret White in Carrie: The Musical. This musical is infamous for its short-lived life on Broadway, and has been a discussion among many musical fans for decades. In 2012, Carrie came back to the stage in an off-broadway version with many revisions.

On January 28, 2013, she was inducted into The American Theater Hall of Fame. From January–March 2013, she starred in the London Premiere of Jerry Herman's Dear World, receiving rave reviews. The musical was directed and choreographed by Gillian Lynne, with whom Buckley had previously worked on Cats.

In September 2013, she starred in the world premiere of Horton Foote's The Old Friends at the Signature Theatre off-Broadway.  She repeated her performance in 2014 at Houston's famed Alley Theatre.

In May 2015, it was announced that Buckley would appear as Big Edie in the musical, Grey Gardens at Bay Street Theater in Sag Harbor, NY. The production ran August 4, 2015, through August 30, 2015. She reprised the role from July 13, to August 14, 2016, at the Ahmanson Theater in Los Angeles.

On February 12, 2018, it was announced that Buckley would portray the title role in the first national tour of the 2017 Broadway revival of Hello, Dolly!, beginning performances in October 2018 in the Connor Palace at Cleveland's Playhouse Square. The cast included Lewis J. Stadlen as Horace Vandergelder, Nic Rouleau as Cornelius, Analisa Leaning as Irene Molloy, Jess LeProtto as Barnaby, Kristen Hahn as Minnie Fay, Colin LeMoine as Ambrose Kemper, Morgan Kirner, as Ermengarde, and Jessica Sheridan as Ernestina. Ms. Buckley finished her leg of the tour in September 2019 and is now preparing concerts scheduled in early 2020 at the Cafe Carlyle in NYC and other venues.

Music career 

Hope, Buckley's 18th solo album, was released on June 8, 2018, and she continues to appear in concert across the U.S. each year. She is also a composer; her first recording contains mostly songs she wrote. She is also featured on many Broadway compilation recordings, and on the original cast recording of 1776; the original Broadway recording of Cats; the London recording of Promises, Promises; Triumph of Love and The Mystery of Edwin Drood.

In 2002, Buckley was nominated for a Grammy Award in the Best Traditional Pop Vocal Album Category, for her album Stars and the Moon: Live at the Donmar, which was recorded at the Donmar Warehouse Theatre in London. This was her second Grammy nomination; she had previously been nominated in 2000, in the Best Spoken Word Album category for The Diaries of Adam and Eve.

Her albums Quintessence and 1967 were released by Playbill Records in February 2008. Quintessence features jazz arrangements of standards by her former collaborator, jazz pianist Kenny Werner; while 1967 is a recording produced by T-Bone Burnett, and made when Buckley was just 19.

Her album Bootleg: Boardmixes From the Road was released in 2010, and her recording of her hit show at Feinstein's at the Regency with pianist/collaborator  Christian Jacob, entitled Ah, Men: The Boys of Broadway debuted on 28 August 2012.

Her album Ghostlight was produced by the T Bone Burnett and was released on September 16, 2014.

Personal life
Buckley was married to Peter Flood in 1972, divorced in 1979, and has no children.

Accomplished horsewoman/NCHA cutting horse 
She lives on a ranch in Texas with two horses, a donkey, several rescued cats, and three dogs, and, as an accomplished horsewoman, participated in NCHA cutting horse competitions for several years while continuing to appear in films, television and theater and to sing concerts in a wide variety of venues.

Acting and music teacher 
Buckley has also taught song interpretation and scene study for over 40 years. She conducts master classes in Fort Worth, New York City, Los Angeles, Denver and other cities around the country. In 2020, she has continued to hold her classes online due to the COVID-19 pandemic from her home.

Buckley has a large following on social media and posts regularly.

Buckley's official website contains her concert and theater schedule, a detailed biography and timeline, and summaries of her singing and acting accomplishments.

Honorary Doctorates 
She has received two Honorary Doctorates for her contribution to the Musical Theater from The Boston Conservatory and Marymount Manhattan College.

Filmography

Discography

Awards and nominations

Honorary awards
2004 Legend of Cabaret Award
2007 Texas Film Hall of Fame Inductee
2012 American Theater Hall of Fame Inductee

References

External links

 
 
 
 
 
 Official Website for Carrie The Musical
 TonyAwards.com Interview with Betty Buckley
 AMC Interview with Betty Buckley about The Happening
 Sony BMG Masterworks Betty Buckley Podcast
 @BettyBuckley (Veified Twitter Account)

1947 births
Living people
people from Big Spring, Texas
Actresses from Fort Worth, Texas
American women singers
American film actresses
Daytime Emmy Award winners
Singers from Texas
Texas Christian University alumni
Tony Award winners
American musical theatre actresses
American stage actresses
Texas Democrats
21st-century American women